Stade Francis-Rongiéras is a multi-purpose stadium in Périgueux, France that is home to rugby union club CA Périgueux. It has a capacity of maximum capacity of  10,000 and opened in 1976. The stadium is named after Francis Rongiéras, a former captain of CA Périgueux that died in 1991 at the age of 33. It has a regular capacity of 6352.

References

Francis-Rongieras
Athletics (track and field) venues in France
Sports venues in Dordogne
Sports venues completed in 1976